Jack Yeandle (born on 22 December 1989) Yeandle is the current club captain for Exeter Chiefs in the Aviva Premiership. His playing position is Hooker. Yeandle Joined Exeter from former RFU Championship rivals Doncaster Knights along with Doncaster team mate Alex Brown. He was a replacement as Exeter Chiefs defeated Wasps to be crowned champions of the 2016-17 English Premiership.

References

External links
Exeter Chiefs profile
Aviva Premiership profile
ESPN Profile

1989 births
Living people
English rugby union players
Exeter Chiefs players
Rugby union players from Exeter
Rugby union hookers